Mickaël Christophe Biron (born 26 August 1997) is a Martiniquais professional footballer who plays for Belgian club RWDM and the Martinique national team.

Career
On 2 July 2021, Biron moved from Nancy to Oostende, and was loaned back to Nancy for one season immediately after. Both clubs are owned by the Pacific Media Group.

On 16 July 2022, Biron signed a three-year contract with RWDM.

Career statistics

Club

Notes

International 

Scores and results list Martinique's goal tally first, score column indicates score after each Biron goal.

References

External links
 Mickaël Biron at Caribbean Football Database

1997 births
Living people
Association football forwards
Martiniquais footballers
SAS Épinal players
AS Nancy Lorraine players
K.V. Oostende players
RWDM47 players
Ligue 2 players
Championnat National 2 players
Challenger Pro League players
Martinique international footballers
2019 CONCACAF Gold Cup players
French expatriate footballers
Martiniquais expatriate footballers
Expatriate footballers in Switzerland
Expatriate footballers in Belgium
French expatriate sportspeople in Switzerland
Martiniquais expatriate sportspeople in Switzerland
French expatriate sportspeople in Belgium
Martiniquais expatriate sportspeople in Belgium